Janko Leskovar (12 December 1861 – 4 February 1949) was a Croatian novelist. His literary form was marked with the novella Misao na vječnost.

Biography 
Leskovar was born in Valentinovo to a noble family. His grandfather was a blacksmith. His father was named Ivan Leskovar, while his wife was Terezija Leskovar.

Leskovar worked as a teacher. He finished the novel Misao na vječnost as a middle-aged writer. The novel was published in 1891 in the magazine Vijenac.

In his decade of writing influence, Leskovar was preoccupied with various psychological analyses of his story characters.

His birth house remains preserved in Valentinovo.

Works 
 Endless contemplation 
 Fallen castles 
 Shadows of love 
 Catastrophe 
 After the accident 
 The lost son 
 Jesenski cvijeci

Sources

1861 births
1949 deaths
Croatian novelists
Croatian male writers
Male novelists